Mounia Gasmi (born 2 May 1990) is a Paralympian athlete from Algeria competing mainly in F32 classification throwing events.

Gasmi represented her country at the 2012 Summer Paralympics in London, entering both the F32-34 shot put and the F31/32/51 club throw events. She finished seventh in the shot put, but a best distance of 22.51 metres in the club throw saw her take the silver medal. As well as her Paralympic success Gasmi has qualified for four consecutive IPC World Championships winning one gold and three silver medals, two silvers in the shot put and a gold and silver in the club throw. Her distance of 25.07m at the 2017 World ParaAthletics Championships in London gave Gasmi her first World title.

She won the bronze medal in the women's club throw F32 event at the 2020 Summer Paralympics held in Tokyo, Japan.

Notes

External links 
 

Paralympic athletes of Algeria
Athletes (track and field) at the 2012 Summer Paralympics
Athletes (track and field) at the 2016 Summer Paralympics
Athletes (track and field) at the 2020 Summer Paralympics
Paralympic silver medalists for Algeria
Paralympic bronze medalists for Algeria
Living people
1990 births
Medalists at the 2012 Summer Paralympics
Medalists at the 2016 Summer Paralympics
Medalists at the 2020 Summer Paralympics
Algerian female club throwers
Algerian female shot putters
People from Batna, Algeria
African Games bronze medalists for Algeria
African Games medalists in athletics (track and field)
Athletes (track and field) at the 2011 All-Africa Games
World Para Athletics Championships winners
Paralympic medalists in athletics (track and field)
20th-century Algerian women
21st-century Algerian women